1225 Ariane, provisional designation , is a stony Florian asteroid from the inner regions of the asteroid belt, approximately 9 kilometers in diameter. It was discovered on 23 April 1930, by Dutch astronomer Hendrik van Gent at the Leiden Southern Station, annex to the Johannesburg Observatory in South Africa.

Orbit and characterization 

Ariane orbits the Sun at a distance of 2.1–2.4 AU once every 3 years and 4 months (1,219 days). Its orbit has an eccentricity of 0.07 and an inclination of 3° with respect to the ecliptic.

Photometric observations made in 2003 at the U.S. Carbuncle Hill Observatory (912) near Providence, Rhode Island, give a synodic rotation period of  hours.

Naming 

This minor planet was named after "Ariane Leprieur", the principal role in the play Le Chemin de Crête by Gabriel Marcel (1889–1973). The official naming citation was first mentioned in The Names of the Minor Planets by Paul Herget in 1955.

References

External links 
 Asteroid Lightcurve Database (LCDB), query form (info )
 Dictionary of Minor Planet Names, Google books
 Asteroids and comets rotation curves, CdR – Observatoire de Genève, Raoul Behrend
 Discovery Circumstances: Numbered Minor Planets (1)-(5000) – Minor Planet Center
 
 

001225
Discoveries by Hendrik van Gent
Named minor planets
19300423